Opsariichthys dienbienensis is a species of cyprinid in the genus Opsariichthys.

References

Cyprinid fish of Asia
Fish of Vietnam
Taxa named by Nguyễn Văn Hảo
Taxa named by Nguyễn Hữu Dực
Fish described in 2000